Broomfield is a rural community in the Hurunui District, in the northern part of Canterbury in New Zealand's South Island. It is approximately 10 minutes drive West of Amberley.

Education

References

Hurunui District
Populated places in Canterbury, New Zealand